This is a list of public art in Savannah, Georgia, in the United States. This list applies only to works of public art on permanent display in an outdoor public space. For example, this does not include artwork in museums. Public art may include sculptures, statues, monuments, memorials, murals, and mosaics.

References 

Savannah, Georgia
Savannah, Georgia
Savannah, Georgia